Tocoa may refer to:
 Tocoa, Colón, Honduras
 Río Tocoa, in Honduras
 Toccoa, Georgia, in the United States.